Jiří Pimpara (born 4 February 1987), is a Czech professional footballer who plays for Ústí nad Labem as a defender.

Honours
 Slovan Liberec
Czech Cup: 2014–15

References

External links
 Futbalnet profile
 Eurofotbal profile
 

1987 births
Living people
Czech footballers
Association football defenders
FK Teplice players
FK Ústí nad Labem players
FK Varnsdorf players
FC Slovan Liberec players
FK Železiarne Podbrezová players
FC Sellier & Bellot Vlašim players
People from Rumburk
Czech First League players
Slovak Super Liga players
FK Viktoria Žižkov players
Czech National Football League players
Sportspeople from the Ústí nad Labem Region